In mathematics, the convolution power is the n-fold iteration of the convolution with itself.

where ∗ denotes the convolution operation of functions on Rd and δ0 is the Dirac delta distribution.  This definition makes sense if x is an integrable function (in L1), a rapidly decreasing distribution (in particular, a compactly supported distribution) or is a finite Borel measure.

If x is the distribution function of a random variable on the real line, then the nth convolution power of x gives the distribution function of the sum of n independent random variables with identical distribution x.  The central limit theorem states that if x is in L1 and L2 with mean zero and variance σ2, then

where Φ is the cumulative standard normal distribution on the real line.  Equivalently,  tends weakly to the standard normal distribution.

In some cases, it is possible to define powers x*t for arbitrary real t > 0.  If μ is a probability measure, then μ is infinitely divisible provided there exists, for each positive integer n, a probability measure μ1/n such that

That is, a measure is infinitely divisible if it is possible to define all nth roots.  Not every probability measure is infinitely divisible, and a characterization of infinitely divisible measures is of central importance in the abstract theory of stochastic processes.  Intuitively, a measure should be infinitely divisible provided it has a well-defined "convolution logarithm."  The natural candidate for measures having such a logarithm are those of (generalized) Poisson type, given in the form

In fact, the Lévy–Khinchin theorem states that a necessary and sufficient condition for a measure to be infinitely divisible is that it must lie in the closure, with respect to the vague topology, of the class of Poisson measures .

Many applications of the convolution power rely on being able to define the analog of analytic functions as formal power series with powers replaced instead by the convolution power.  Thus if  is an analytic function, then one would like to be able to define

If x ∈ L1(Rd) or more generally is a finite Borel measure on Rd, then the latter series converges absolutely in norm provided that the norm of x is less than the radius of convergence of the original series defining F(z).  In particular, it is possible for such measures to define the convolutional exponential

Properties
If x is itself suitably differentiable, then from the properties of convolution, one has

where  denotes the derivative operator.  Specifically, this holds if x is a compactly supported distribution or lies in the Sobolev space W1,1 to ensure that the derivative is sufficiently regular for the convolution to be well-defined.

Applications
In the configuration random graph, the size distribution of connected components can be expressed via the convolution power of the excess degree distribution:

Here,  is the size distribution for connected components,  is the excess degree distribution, and  denotes the degree distribution.

As convolution algebras are special cases of Hopf algebras, the convolution power is a special case of the (ordinary) power in a Hopf algebra.  In applications to quantum field theory, the convolution exponential, convolution logarithm, and other analytic functions based on the convolution are constructed as formal power series in the elements of the algebra .  If, in addition, the algebra is a Banach algebra, then convergence of the series can be determined as above.  In the formal setting, familiar identities such as

continue to hold.  Moreover, by the permanence of functional relations, they hold at the level of functions, provided all expressions are well-defined in an open set by convergent series.

See also
Convolution
Convolution theorem
Fourier transform
Taylor series

References
 .
 .
 .
 .
 .
 .
 .

Functional analysis
Fourier analysis